Lada is one of eight parishes in Langreo, a municipality within the province and autonomous community of Asturias, in northern Spain.

Lada has a population of 3.500 inhabitants. In Lada, the German enterprise Bayer produce the world 100% acetylsalicylic acid for the aspirin. Lada has also an important  thermal power station. Until the Spanish industrial conversion, Lada hosted a lot of little factories.

Parishes in Langreo
Langreo